Castle Heights is a neighborhood on the Westside of the city of Los Angeles, California.

Founded in 1922, the neighborhood contains roughly 900 single-family residences, along with multi-family apartments and condominiums with a limited amount of commercial property.

Geography

The neighborhood is bound by Cheviot Hills to the west, Beverlywood to the north, and the Santa Monica Freeway to the south and east.

The neighborhood's multi-family housing is concentrated along the southern half of the neighborhood, while its commercial buildings are concentrated along National Boulevard between the Santa Monica Freeway and Castle Heights Avenue, and along South Robertson Boulevard.

History

Castle Heights was established in 1922, and many of the single family residences date from the 1920s to the 1940s and were built in the Spanish Revival style. The last tract of homes was completed in 1962, and many of the multi-family buildings date from around that time.

The second phase of the Expo Line runs adjacent to the neighborhood, along the Santa Monica Freeway, and the Palms Station is located at the border of Castle Heights and Palms.

Castle Heights has historically been less affluent than the surrounding neighborhoods of Cheviot Hills and Beverlywood. Many of the residents are employees at local movie studios, as the neighborhood is a short drive from both Fox Studios and Sony Studios.

Government and Infrastructure

Police service

The Los Angeles Police Department operates the West Los Angeles Community Police Station at 1663 Butler Avenue, 90025, serving the neighborhood.

Education

The schools within Castle Heights are as follows:

 Castle Heights Elementary School, 9755 Cattaraugus Avenue
 Alexander Hamilton High School, 2955 South Robertson Boulevard

Parks and recreation

There are no parks in Castle Heights, but Irvine Schachter Park and Woodbine Park are both located just a few blocks from the neighborhood.

See also
 Expo Phase 2 (Los Angeles Metro)
 Los Angeles, California
 List of districts and neighborhoods of Los Angeles

Notes

External links
Castle Heights Homeowners Association

Neighborhoods in Los Angeles
Westside (Los Angeles County)
West Los Angeles